City Connect is a brand name of alternate uniforms made by Nike, Inc. for Major League Baseball (MLB) teams. The jerseys feature different color schemes, fonts, and graphical elements compared with the teams' typical home and away uniforms. Fourteen of MLB's 30 teams have a City Connect uniform.

Descriptions

Nike and MLB introduced the first round of City Connect uniforms before the 2021 season. A second round debuted during the 2022 season.

Introduced in 2021

Seven teams started wearing City Connect jerseys during the 2021 MLB season.

Arizona Diamondbacks, sand-colored with black letters and red numbers, and with "Serpientes" in front as an homage to Arizona's Hispanic community.
Boston Red Sox, with a yellow base and blue letters as homage to the Boston Marathon, which normally takes place on Patriots' Day.
Chicago Cubs, dark blue with sky blue accents, with elements inspired by the flag of Chicago. The uniform has "Wrigleyville" on the front, in a lettering style similar to the Wrigley Field marquee.
Chicago White Sox, in a dark grey shade with white pinstripes and featuring Gothic-styled lettering as homage to the South Side of Chicago.
Los Angeles Dodgers, with a blue cap, jersey, and pants with “Los Dodgers” written on the cap and jersey. Jersey also includes black on the sleeves as a nod to street art culture in Los Angeles. Cap was revised in 2022, moving the "Los Dodgers" to the side, replacing it with the traditional "LA" logo, and adding black to the brim and button.
Miami Marlins, with a red base, white pinstripes and white letters with light blue trim as a tribute to the Cuban Sugar Kings.
San Francisco Giants, with an orange and white design, a silhouette of the Golden Gate Bridge and a unique fog gradient across the front, sleeves and numbering of the jerseys.

Introduced in 2022

The seven teams that introduced City Connect uniforms in 2021 continue to wear them for selected games. Seven additional teams introduced City Connect uniforms in 2022.

 Colorado Rockies, with a green base, purple accents, Colorado written on the front and a special logo on the cap resembling the state's license plates. 
 Houston Astros, with a navy base, tequila sunset accents (suggestive of its 70s and 80s rainbow uniforms), "Space City" stenciled in the NASA 'worm' font on the front, and a hat with a planet revolving around a futuristic version of the "H-star" logo, in honor of Houston being home to the Johnson Space Center.
 Kansas City Royals, with a navy base and powder blue accents, and a stylized "KC" insignia in homage to Kansas City's "City of Fountains" nickname.
 Los Angeles Angels, with a sand base, red accents and "Angels" written on the front in honor of the beaches in Southern California. 
 Milwaukee Brewers, with a powder blue base, navy accents, yellow and white striping, a grill and bratwurst patch, the team's "Brew Crew" nickname, and the MKE airport code with "414" blended in on the hat in honor of being in Milwaukee during the summer. 
 San Diego Padres, with a white base, pink and mint sleeves, and San Diego on the front in honor of the culture of both the city of San Diego and Tijuana.
 Washington Nationals, with an anthracite base, pink accents and printed cherry blossoms in honor of the annual National Cherry Blossom Festival.

Reaction

Boston.com conducted a poll of its readers in April 2021 and found a polarized reaction to the Red Sox's yellow and blue City Connect jerseys. About 49% of respondents said that they loved the new uniforms, about 36% said that they hated them, and about 9% chose the "I'm speechless" option. After the Red Sox wore the City Connect uniforms for four consecutive games in September 2021, winning all four, manager Alex Cora said that the team would continue to wear them for as long as they kept winning. "I'm sorry, but if we continue winning, we've got to stay with them," Xander Bogaerts told NESN.

A columnist for the San Francisco Examiner wrote in May 2022 that the Giants had a record of 12 wins and 2 losses in their City Connect jerseys. Although some fans derided their design as looking like an orange Creamsicle, fans eventually warmed to the jersey, increasingly wearing them to games on Tuesday nights, when the team typically wears their City Connect uniforms.

Of the first 11 City Connect designs, USA Today'''s For the Win'' blog ranked the White Sox's uniform design as the best and the Giants' design as the worst. In a July 2022 review ranking the first 14 uniform designs, ESPN's Joon Lee described the City Connect program as the league's boldest alternative jersey designs since the Turn Ahead the Clock promotions of the late 1990s. Lee rated the Rockies' City Connect uniforms as the best, and the Dodgers as the worst.

The Padres' City Connect uniforms generated $240,000 in revenue at the team's official store on July 1, 2022, their first day of sale. The last time the team had introduced a new alternative uniform, in 2020, the team store sold $73,000 worth of merchandise on launch day.

References

See also

 Major League Baseball uniforms

Major League Baseball uniforms